Attack Attack! (released as Attack Attack! (US) in the UK) is the second studio album by American metalcore band Attack Attack! It was released on June 8, 2010, through Rise Records. It was produced by Joey Sturgis. The album was initially titled "Shazam!", but due to copyright issues, it was self-titled.

It is the first album to feature Caleb Shomo on lead vocals, replacing former lead vocalist Nick Barham who had replaced original lead vocalist Austin Carlile but had not recorded an album with the band. It is also the final album to include former clean vocalist and rhythm guitarist Johnny Franck.

It peaked at number 26 on the Billboard 200, as well as topping the Independent Albums chart and peaking within the Alternative, Rock, and Digital Album charts. It received mixed reviews from music critics, with praise generated around the album's heavier tracks and negativity directed toward the electronicore and electropop songs.

A deluxe reissue of the album was released on July 19, 2011, through Rise Records, which included four new tracks, two remixes, and two acoustic tracks. It was announced when the band premiered the bonus track and lead single, "Last Breath" on June 7, which was released for digital download on June 23, 2011.

Background 
On November 25, 2009, lead guitarist Andrew Whiting announced information about an upcoming album. The band began performing four confirmed tracks during their tour: "Sexual Man Chocolate", "Renob, Nevada", "A for Andrew", and "AC-130". The album was initially titled Shazam, but due to copyright issues, it was self-titled.

Release 
The album was released on June 8, 2010, through Rise Records, after initially planning to be released on May 25. It peaked at number 26 on the Billboard 200, selling more than 15,000 copies in its first week. It also topped the Billboard Independent Albums chart, as well as peaking at numbers 5, 6, and 14 on the Alternative, Rock, and Digital Album charts. Its second single, "Smokahontas", was released on January 11, 2011. A music video for the song was uploaded onto Rise's official YouTube on January 21, 2011, and has accumulated 14 million views to date.

A deluxe reissue of the album was released on July 19, 2011, through Rise Records, and features four bonus tracks, two remixes, and two acoustic tracks. It was first announced when the band premiered the song, "Last Breath", on Rise's official YouTube channel on June 7, 2011. It was released for digital download on June 27.

Promotion for the album began before and during the 2010 Vans Warped Tour, playing a 3 show mini tour which included a stop in Tulsa, Oklahoma performing with such bands as Upright, Cutthroat, and My Morning Skyline, whilst promotion for the deluxe reissued album began during the 2011 Vans Warped Tour.

Track listing

Charts

Personnel 
Attack Attack!
Johnny Franck – clean vocals, guitars 
John Holgado – bass guitar
Caleb Shomo – lead vocals, programming, keyboards, synthesizers
Andrew Wetzel – drums
Andrew Whiting – guitars

Production
Joey Sturgis – production, engineered, mastering, mixing
Eric Rushing – management
Dave Shapiro – booking
Caleb Shomo – production
Doug Cunningham – artwork

Deluxe edition production
John Feldmann – production, engineered, mastering, mixing, co-writing on tracks "Last Breath" and "Criminal"
Caleb Shomo – production, engineered, mastering, mixing on tracks "Pick a Side" and "All Alone"
Glenn Thomas – design
Steven Taylor – photography

References 

Attack Attack! albums
2010 albums
Rise Records albums
Albums produced by Joey Sturgis